Close Mountain is a summit in West Virginia, in the United States.

Close Mountain derives its name from David Closs, a Scottish settler.

References

Mountains of Tucker County, West Virginia
Mountains of West Virginia